The Lynwood Tourist Court Historic District encompasses a historic tourist accommodation, now known as the Lynwood Motel, at 857 Park Avenue in Hot Springs, Arkansas, United States.  Built about 1944, it is a little-altered example of a 1940s traveler accommodation with English Revival styling.  It has sixteen units, each of which originally included a garage (now enclosed to create additional living space), and a small office building.  Each unit includes a sleeping area, bathroom, and kitchenette, and is marked on the exterior by a steeply-pitched gable.

The district was listed on the National Register of Historic Places in 2004.

See also
National Register of Historic Places listings in Garland County, Arkansas

References

Tudor Revival architecture in the United States
Buildings and structures completed in 1944
Buildings and structures in Hot Springs, Arkansas
Historic districts on the National Register of Historic Places in Arkansas
National Register of Historic Places in Hot Springs, Arkansas